DieselJet s.r.l. is an aircraft engine manufacturer based in Castel Maggiore, Italy.
It was established in 2003 and grown in partnership with the University of Bologna, Forlì Airport ISAERS and Centro Ricerche FIAT (CRF).
Lycoming Engines licensed its TDA engines in 2009–2010.
Metatron S.p.A., an automotive industry group field manufacturing Compressed natural gas and Liquefied petroleum gas systems, own it since 2011.

Products 
It made its maiden flight on 17 January 2005 with an IAI Heron UAV.
It powered the Alenia Aermacchi Sky-Y UAV demonstrator on its 20 June 2007 first flight
Its 82mm bore and 90.4mm stroke lead to a 1910 cm3 displacement, it have a 16.0 compression ratio and a 1600 bar common rail and the manufacturer announces , 121 kW / 165 hp maximum and 110 kW continuously till an 8000 ft critical altitude and a  fuel consumption.
It is based on the 1.9 JTD engine.
It powered the IAI Super Heron first flight in 2012 and aims for a 1,500 hours MTBF, a 1,000 hours Time between overhaul initially then 2,000 in service for a €25,000 Cost and a 2,000 hours initial service life then 4,000.
The 1955 cm3 engine has cylinders bores of 83 mm and 90.4 mm strokes, a 16.0:1 compression ratio for a  min. brake specific fuel consumption, its manufacturer claims , a 8,700 ft critical altitude and operability till 35,000 ft.

A light-sport aircraft gasoline engine GA 1.4 8V was in development in 2014-2016.

In 2016, DieselJet was developing a  TDA CR 3.0 24V.

References

External links 
 

Aircraft engine manufacturers of Italy
Aircraft diesel engines